Kundhikulhudhoo (Dhivehi: ކެނދިކުޅުދޫ) is one of the inhabited islands of Noonu Atoll in the northern province of Maldives. The island is among the 10th biggest islands in the Maldives archipelago.

According to the census 2014, Kundhikulhudhoo is home to 1767 people making the island most populous in the atoll after Velidhoo, Holhudhoo, and Manadhoo.

History
The most important day in the history of Kundhikulhudhoo was the day people of Tholhendhoo migrated to the island. Severe island erosion led the people of Tholhendhoo to migrate to Kundhikulhudhoo on 1 January 1993.

Geography 
Kendhikulhudhoo is located at 5° 56' 58"N degree of latitude and 73° 25'00'E degree of longitude.

The geography of Kendhikulhudhoo is unique with six mangrove areas locally known as "kulhi" in the island. They are "Mai falhu", "Dhimaafalhu", "Hikikulhi", "Tholhifalhu", "Gan'baafalhu", Fin'dhana gonni and "Gaathudee kolhu". However, these mangrove areas are faced with a major problem of dumping garbage by the islanders. In addition, an aquaculture project carried out recently in the largest mangrove area "Mai falhu" destroyed part of the mangrove ecosystem in the area.

Bluepeace, a non-government organization focused on environmental protection of Maldives reported that these mangrove areas absorbed much of the impact of the December 2004 saving the island from the destruction of property and loss of human lives. Several projects have been initiated by local NGOs to protect the mangrove areas in the island. One of such project was "Save KK" initiated by Society for Kendhikulhudhoo Island Development (SKID) in association with UNDP.

Demography

Kendhikulhudhoo has the 4th largest population in the atoll with a registered population of 1767 people of which 882 are male and 885 are female. However, only 1288 people live in the island as per census 2014. Since more men work in resorts, industrial islands, and capital Male’, 724 women live on the island compared to 564 men.

As per the statistics of a secretariat of Kendhikulhudhoo council, the population of Kendhikolhu is slightly higher than the population of Kulhudhoo with 923 people in Kendhikolhu while 898 people in Kulhudhoo. The total number of households in Kendhikolhu and Kulhudhoo altogether is 241.

The population of the island is expected to grow at 0.79% annually which is 0.17% higher than atoll population growth average of 0.69%.  If the growth is maintained at this rate, the population would reach to 3000 people in 2021.

Governance
People in Kendhikulhudhoo resides in two wards namely Kendhikolhu (Dhivehi: ކެނދިކޮޅު) which is south of the island and Kulhudhoo (Dhivehi: ކުޅުދޫ) which is the north of the island. Until the local government law which was enacted on 17 May 2010, the two wards were two separate administrative units managed by island offices located in each ward. This developed rivalry and resistance which led to some social issues in the past.

Education 

Kendhikulhudhoo School is the only school on the island. It is a public school under the jurisdiction of Ministry of Education which provides preschool, primary, secondary and higher secondary education. There are 455 students currently studying in the school. The school is renowned as a leading edge school in Noonu Atoll and were among the first schools to incorporate science as well as commerce stream subjects in secondary and higher secondary level. The school strives for excellence in all areas, with a well-led team of staff, all highly committed to improving the standard of teaching and learning.

In addition, an outreach center under the Faculty of Open Learning of Maldives National University was recently established in the island. The center currently offers foundation, diploma and degree programs in the field of business, judicial administration and education. Courses open for admission in the center January 2017 include Bachelor of Business, Diploma in Judicial Administration, Bachelor of Teaching primary and English for Further Studies. There are some other educational institutions like Quran classes and tuition centers as well in the island.

Economy 

The island has 16 shops and 6 restaurants. Most of the shops are dedicated to retail grocery and daily use items while there are 3 shops which sell garment and cosmetic items and 2 dedicated to selling construction materials as well. Major items required for construction like cement, timber and plastic pipe and fittings can be bought from these shops. Goods like furniture and other household items which are not available on the island are bought from the Atoll capital Manadhoo and Capital Male'.

Majority of the working age population work in tourism industry especially the youth population. However, an equal number of people also work in the fishing industry. Currently, there are 7 fishing vessels operating on the island. Some have also found employment in the few government institutions in the island while others work in capital Male in public or private offices.

There are 5 government institutions providing employment for the people. The biggest employer among them is Kendhikulhudhoo School followed by Kendhikulhudhoo health center and Secretariat of Kendhikulhudhoo council.  Kendhikulhudhoo court and the branch of FENAKA cooperation in the island providing electricity to the households also provides some employment opportunities.

The island does not have any bank or a branch of a bank. However, one retail shop provides a cash back service where customers can withdraw up to MVR 2000 per transaction from debit cards of Bank of Maldives. Apart from this, a team of Bank of Maldives visits the island every month for one day.  This team provides some banking functions like deposits, withdrawals, and applications for different services offered by Bank of Maldives.

Tourism 
Lack of proper transportation from the island to connect to major transport hubs in the country has limited the opportunity to open guesthouses and such tourist establishments in the island. The most common mode of transportation from the island to capital Male' is by boat which takes approximately 10 to 12 hours of travel. A scheduled speed boat also operates from Noonu Atoll to the capital twice a week.

The domestic airport at Raa Atoll Ifuru is the closet airport to the island. It cost around MVR 3000 to travel from Kendhikulhudhoo to Ifuru by speed boat.

There are speed boats for hire available on the kendhikulhudhoo and other islands close to the airport. Few also uses seaplane flying from Hulhule' International Airport to nearby resorts to access to the island. However, these planes are dedicated for tourist visiting the resorts, getting a seat from a seaplane is difficult and the operator cannot confirm your seat until the last moment.

A couple of options are available for accommodation on the island. Currently, there are two dedicated places providing room for rental on a daily basis. The best known among them is the recently opened Rizofora Inn. Rizzafora Inn offers rooms per night at the rate of MVR 350. Apart from this, some households might also offer the extra room in their home for rental.

References

Islands of the Maldives